Veaceslav Iordan (born 12 June 1966 in Chircăieşti, Causeni) is a Moldovan politician who served as interim Mayor of Chișinău from January–June 2007.

Biography
Veaceslav Iordan was born on June 12, 1966 in the village of Chircăieşti, Căușeni District. After graduating from secondary school in his native town in 1983, became a student at the Faculty of Engineering of the Academy of Construction in Kharkov (Ukraine). 
After a year of study he did his mandatory military service in the Soviet Army, during the years 1984-1986. In 1986 he returned to the Academy where he continued his studies, obtaining a diploma in engineering. 
He began work as an engineer at the engineering department of Hotel Inturist from 1993-1998. In 1998 he was employed as head of maintenance services for Railways of Moldova. In 2000 he was appointed as deputy director general for social and capital construction in the same company.

In 2003, he was elected on party lists of Moldova to the Chișinău municipal council, then on April 13, 2006, was elected Deputy Mayor of Chișinău. In the new position, he coordinated infrastructure issues household utilities, roads, transport, public lighting, funeral services, and the village green.

Appointment as Interim General Mayor of Chișinău
In 2003 Veaceslav Iordan was elected as municipal councilor of Chișinău on the lists of the Party of Communists of the Republic of Moldova, and then on April 13, 2006 was elected as deputy mayor of Chișinău municipality. In the new position, he coordinated the problems related to the communal household infrastructure, roads, transport, public lighting, funeral services, green spaces and was also responsible for the activity of "Termocom" JSC, "Apa-canal Chișinău" JSC, CET-1, CET-2, "Chișinău-Gaz ".

The appointment of the acting interim mayor of Chișinău, Vasile Ursu, as minister came just four months before the general local elections in May, elections in which the interim mayor of Chișinău had announced the decision not to run. Vasile Ursu has resigned as mayor of Chișinău since January 25, 2007 and has empowered deputy mayor Veaceslav Iordan to perform the duties of the acting interim mayor of Chișinău.

According to the Regulation regarding the activity of the municipal self-administration bodies, the right on empowering  of the acting interim general  mayor of the Chișinău municipality has the head of the administration of Chișinău. According to the Infotag Agency, at the extraordinary meeting of the Chișinău Municipal Council (CMC), several councilors have questioned the right of the acting interim mayor to appoint his successor, stating that this is the prerogative of the Council.

In 2005, for special work merits, Veaceslav Iordan was decorated with the  Order of the Republic. 

In a Top of the most influential Moldovans made up in 2006, Veaceslav Iordan ranked 10th, while interim mayor Vasile Ursu ranked 19th.

At the local elections on June 3, 2007, Veaceslav Iordan obtained only 27.62% of the votes, with only three percent more than the first candidate Dorin Chirtoacă, and in the second round  held on  June 17, 2007, given to the coalition of the majority of the opposition parties, he obtained only 38.83% of the votes and lost the elections.

On August 1, 2007, the Government of the Republic of Moldova appointed Veaceslav Iordan as general director of the  "Apele Moldovei" Agency.

References

External links 
 Electoral Program of the Candidate to the Position of General Mayor of Chisinau Veaceslav Iordan 
 New interim mayor of Chisinau presented a list of tasks to capital's administration 
 Bătălia pentru Chişinău. Veaceslav Iordan. „Ştiu exact ce trebuie să fac” 
 Veaceslav Iordan a atacat Primăria în judecată

Mayors of Chișinău
Recipients of the Order of the Republic (Moldova)
Recipients of the Order of Honour (Moldova)
Living people
1966 births